Abdul Mutalib Mohd Daud (also known as Mutalib MD; 1961 – 29 June 2013) was an ISA detainee, as well as the founder and chief editor of the news portal Sabahkini.net in Sabah, Malaysia. At the time of his death, he had completed two as yet unpublished books, one on the banning of Nurul Izzah Anwar from Sabah. In 2011 Communications and Culture Minister Datuk Seri Dr. Rais Yatim filed a defamation lawsuit against Mutalib for allegations that the minister had raped his maid. He is the author of over 20 books, two of which, YB and VIP, are about sex scandals among public personalities.

Selected publications 
 IC Palsu: Merampas Hak Anak Sabah.
 IC Projek Agenda Tersembunyi Mahathir (where Mahathir stood for Mahathir Mohamad, the former prime minister of Malaysia).
 Skandal Seks VVIP.

See also
 Royal Commission of Inquiry on illegal immigrants in Sabah
 Project IC
 Megat Junid Megat Ayub

References

External links
 MutalibMD.blogspot.com
 The Sabahkini: Al-Fatihah untuk Mutalib MD
 The Borneo Post: Mutalib’s death a terrible loss – Jeffrey
 The Borneo Insider: Al-Fatihah untuk Mutalib MD

1961 births
2013 deaths
Malaysian prisoners and detainees
People from Sabah
Prisoners and detainees of Malaysia